Al Musannah Club (also known locally as Al-Siham Al-Hamra'a, or "Red Arrow(s)", or just plainly as Al-Mussanah) is an Omani sports club based in Al-Musannah, Oman. The club is currently playing in the Oman Professional League, top division of Oman Football Association. Their home ground is Al-Seeb Stadium. The stadium is government owned, but they also own their own personal stadium and sports equipment, as well as their own training facilities.

Being a multisport club
Although being mainly known for their football, Al-Mussanah Club like many other clubs in Oman, have not only football in their list, but also hockey, volleyball, handball, basketball, badminton and squash. They also have a youth football team competing in the Omani Youth league.

Colors, kit providers and sponsors
Al-Mussanah Club have been known since establishment to wear a full red or black (Away) kit (usually a darker shade of red). They have also had many different sponsors over the years. As of now, Adidas provides them with kits.

Honours and achievements

National titles

Oman First Division League (0): 
Runners-up 2010-11

Players
Al-Mussanah Club - 2014–15 Oman Professional League

First-team squad

Personnel

Technical staff

References

External links
Al-Mussanah Club Profile at Soccerway.com
Al-Mussanah Club Profile at Goalzz.com

Football clubs in Oman
Oman Professional League
Al Batinah South Governorate
Association football clubs established in 1970
1970 establishments in Oman